Carol Grace (September 11, 1924 – July 21, 2003) was an American actress and author. She is often referred to as Carol Marcus Saroyan or Carol Matthau.

Biography
Carol Grace was born in New York City's Lower East Side; her mother, who was sixteen when she gave birth, was a Russian Jewish immigrant who arrived in New York on August 20, 1913. Her parents  arrived later. Grace never knew her biological father. Her mother, Rosheen "Ray" Marcus ( Brofman, formerly Shapiro), would reportedly later claim it was British actor Leslie Howard, who was killed during WWII. Young Carol was placed in foster care until the age of eight. In 1933, her mother married her second husband, Charles Marcus, who was some two decades Rosheen's senior. He was the very wealthy co-founder of the Bendix Corporation. Grace took his last name as her own. They lived on Park Avenue in luxury, with servants. Two years later he learned that his wife had hidden the existence of another daughter, Elinor, who had been left in a foster home when they married.

Grace was reportedly the inspiration for the Holly Golightly character in Truman Capote's novella Breakfast at Tiffany's.

Her Broadway credits include Once There Was a Russian (1961), The Cold Wind and the Warm (1958), The Square Root of Wonderful (1957), Will Success Spoil Rock Hunter? (1955), The Time of Your Life (1955), and Across the Board on Tomorrow Morning and Talking to You (1942).

She was twice married to Pulitzer Prize-winning writer William Saroyan over an eight-year period.(1943–1949 and 1951–1952). She later stated that he was abusive. The couple had two children: Aram Saroyan, an internationally known writer, and actress Lucy Saroyan (who died in 2003, pre-deceasing her mother by three months).

She subsequently married actor Walter Matthau on August 21, 1959. The couple remained married until his death on July 1, 2000; they had one son, Charles. She had a wide social circle and was known for her wit and good company.

In 1955, Random House published her novella based on her experiences as a foster child, The Secret in the Daisy. In 1992, she published a memoir, Among the Porcupines.

Grace died of a cerebral aneurysm on July 21, 2003, aged 78, and was interred in the same grave as Matthau, who had died 3 years earlier.

Filmography

References

External links

1924 births
2003 deaths
Actresses from New York City
Jewish American actresses
American people of Russian-Jewish descent
American film actresses
20th-century American novelists
Deaths from intracranial aneurysm
Writers from New York City
Burials at Westwood Village Memorial Park Cemetery
20th-century American memoirists
American women novelists
American women memoirists
20th-century American women writers
Novelists from New York (state)
20th-century American actresses
20th-century American Jews
21st-century American Jews
21st-century American women